Lynn Fells Parkway is a parkway in Greater Boston, Massachusetts, in the United States. It is maintained by the Massachusetts Department of Conservation and Recreation. The road runs from the end of Fellsway East in Stoneham, eastward through Melrose, and ends in Saugus at US Route 1. The parkway serves as a connector between the Middlesex Fells Reservation and Breakheart Reservation.

History
The parkway was proposed in 1897 as part of a wide-ranging series of interconnected parkways in the greater Boston area.  The original proposal by the Olmsted Brothers landscape design firm was that the parkway would connect the Middlesex Fells to the Lynn Woods Reservation in Lynn, but the full proposal was never implemented.  The first portion of the parkway, from the Stoneham-Melrose line to Main Street in Melrose, was built between 1906 and 1908, although a particularly difficult section, built on swampy land near Ell Pond Park, was not completed until 1911.  Lack of funding stalled construction of additional sections until 1929, when construction to Route 1 was begun.  Plans to continue the parkway to Lynn Woods only advanced as far as acquiring and grading a right of way from Route 1 to Walnut Street, part of which is now taken over by the figure-eight interchange between the two roads.

The Melrose/Saugus portion of the parkway was added to the National Register of Historic Places on May 9, 2003, listed along with other roadways of the Metropolitan Park System of Greater Boston.  Contributing elements to the National Register listing, in addition to the roadway, are the tree canopy that shades much of the road, and the 1930 girder bridge that carries railroad tracks over the road between Vinton and Tremont Streets in Melrose.

Major intersections

See also
 Middlesex Fells Reservation Parkways
 Fells Connector Parkways
 Middlesex Fells Reservoirs Historic District

References

Parkways in Massachusetts
Melrose, Massachusetts
Saugus, Massachusetts
Stoneham, Massachusetts
Roads on the National Register of Historic Places in Massachusetts
Transportation in Middlesex County, Massachusetts
Transportation in Essex County, Massachusetts
National Register of Historic Places in Essex County, Massachusetts
National Register of Historic Places in Middlesex County, Massachusetts
National Register of Historic Places in Stoneham, Massachusetts
Parks on the National Register of Historic Places in Massachusetts